Sammisoq (old spelling Sangmissoq, ; English traditional:Christian IV Island) is an island in the Kujalleq municipality in southern Greenland, located northeast of Uummannarsuaq cape. It is the largest island of the Cape Farewell Archipelago (Nunap Isua).

Geography
It is separated from mainland Greenland to the north by the narrow Prince Christian Sound. The island has glaciers in the south and in the west. Its coast is deeply indented and its southern part is almost separated from the main island by two narrow inlets. To the south lies Itilleq Island and to the west Annikitsoq, both part of the same group.

There is one settlement, Ikerasassuaq, also called Prince Christian Sound, Prins Christian Sund, or Bluie East One. It is a weather station and has no permanent population.

Sammisoq is mountainous and Niaqornaq, its highest point, is 1546 m above sea level. It is an ultra prominent peak, meaning a journey to any higher mountain involves descending more than 1500 m down before going up again, in this case down to sea level.

See also
List of islands of Greenland

Bibliography

References

Uninhabited islands of Greenland
Kujalleq
Cape Farewell Archipelago